Bacton is a village and civil parish in Suffolk, England, about  north of Stowmarket. The village appeared as 'Bachetuna' in the Domesday Book and the area appears to have been settled at least since Roman times, with many interesting finds on the locally-organised annual metal-detecting days.

At the centre of the village is the Twelfth Century church of St Mary the Virgin, featuring a medieval wall painting.  Nearby is a doctors' surgery, a primary school Bacton Primary, and an under-fives preschool, but Bacton Middle School closed in 2015 as the local authority abandoned the three-tier education system and the site is now cleared and awaiting future redevelopment.  In the original centre of the village is a small village green including a pond  which till 2022 was fished for goldfish, roach, koi and mirror carp. At the start of that year the fish were removed and the pond was drained and restored, but due to the dry summer it did not refill until December and now awaits the return of the fish. Housing in the village is a mixture of many well-preserved centuries-old listed buildings including the 18th century Grade II* listed Bacton Manor, alongside newer individual and estate-type properties with a large proportion of bungalows. During the last thirty years there was little new development other than occasional infill construction, but five large housing developments have now been approved and construction has begun on up to 350 new houses, which will potentially double the population. 

Community facilities include a village hall with newly-updated kitchen, a bowls club and Bacton United football club, with two adult sized floodlit pitches, a junior pitch and a clubhouse. The adult teams play in the Suffolk and Ipswich Football League while there are several junior teams of all age groups.  The clubhouse is available for hire for social occasions, with a well-equipped bar. The church also has a community room for hire.

There are several community groups such as a branch of the Women's Institute, Guides, Brownies and Rainbows, a History Society, Gardening Club, Ladies' Circle and various other clubs and societies.  Unfortunately the cub and scout groups in the village closed some years ago due to lack of volunteers to run them, but the Scout HQ's adjoining large playing field with floodlit football pitch is still in regular use for various events.  There's also a 16th C public house, the Bull at Bacton with a restaurant area and regular live music.

For a village of only around 1200 people, Bacton is surprisingly well served by businesses.  In the heart of the village is Shop Green with a Londis general store and post office, and a petrol and service station for car sales, servicing and repairs. On the Northern outskirts of the village is a new-car dealership (Jeffries), and within its showroom a shop selling country clothing and Steiff collectable teddybears; also on the site is the brewery shop of the Humber Doucy Brewing Company, located elsewhere in the village.  Further along the B1113 and still in Bacton is Finbow's Yard, a small trading estate which is home to a range of businesses including car sales, furniture store, white goods dealer and repairer, hairdressers,  the Heart of Suffolk Distillery (home of Betty's Gin) and a large hardware store and builders merchants, with its builders yard across the road in Cotton, alongside Emzo's gift shop & coffee shop.  At the western end of the village is a flourishing business park with various units including one offering local pizza deliveries.

Like most rural areas, better public transport provision is badly needed.  The Great Eastern Main Line railway between London and Norwich runs through the east end of the village, but Finningham railway station and its goods yard, which was situated in Bacton, was closed in the Beeching cuts of the sixties and only the station building remains, now a private house.  However if you have a car, there is rail access to London via the nearby town of Stowmarket in 80 minutes, which has encouraged an influx of commuters into what was previously a very localised community.  Bus services are minimal, consisting of once-a-week return shopping trips to nearby towns. Perhaps after all it's hardly surprising Bacton has three different car sales businesses and a petrol station!

The parish of Bacton includes the village itself, the adjoining hamlet of Earl's Green and the outlying settlements of Bacton Green, Canham's Green, Cow Green and Ford's Green.  Cow Green, and Tailor's Green and Shop Green within Bacton village, are registered village greens.

References

External links 

 Bacton Parish Council website
 Bacton Primary School Website
 Bacton United '89 FC website
 

Villages in Suffolk
Mid Suffolk District
Civil parishes in Suffolk